John Law (11 November 1929 – 5 January 1970) was a British comedy writer for television, who created the Class sketch for The Frost Report.

Life
Law was born 11 November 1929, in Paisley, Renfrewshire, Scotland. He married Beryl Kaye (1919–2010) a dancer and choreographer, and died 5 January 1970, aged 40.

Work
He wrote for many TV comedy series, including It's a Square World and The Frost Report, working with Michael Bentine and Marty Feldman.  He also worked on the screenplay for the James Bond spoof film Casino Royale, having been recruited for this project by Peter Sellers.

References

External links
 

1929 births
1970 deaths
Writers from Paisley, Renfrewshire
Scottish comedy writers
Scottish television writers
20th-century screenwriters